Josef Hladký (born 18 June 1962 in Prague) is a retired male medley swimmer from the Czech Republic. He competed for Germany at the 1992 Summer Olympics in Barcelona, Spain, finishing in 32nd place in the men's 200 m individual medley event.

References

1962 births
Living people
Czech male swimmers
German male swimmers
Male medley swimmers
Swimmers at the 1992 Summer Olympics
Olympic swimmers of Germany
Sportspeople from Prague
European Aquatics Championships medalists in swimming